Robert Dolan may refer to:
Robert J. Dolan (educator), University of Michigan dean
Robert Dolan (marine geologist) (1929–2016), marine geologist
Robert J. Dolan (politician), mayor of Melrose, Massachusetts
Robert E. Dolan (1906–1972), Broadway composer